Crosshaven RFC (Rugby Union Football Club) was founded on 1 October 1972 and is based in Crosshaven, County Cork, Ireland. The founding members were Michael Dempsey, Chairman, Ted Murphy, Pres., Billy McCarthy Sec., and Tom O' Kelly, Treas, and P.R.O.

The club's senior team plays in the Munster Junior League Division 1. Crosshaven R.F.C. has three pitches, floodlights, parking, showers, changing rooms and a gym, located at Myrtleville Cross in Crosshaven. 

In the 2010/2011 season, Crosshaven won the All-Ireland Junior Cup as the first team from Munster to do so.

Crosshaven RFC has underage teams ranging from under 8's to under 18's. They then have Junior 1 and Junior 2 teams. One product of the youth system is former Munster Rugby and Leicester Tigers scrum-half Frank Murphy who began playing in Myrtleville Cross. In 2011, the Crosshaven RFC under 15's won a Munster Development Cup.

References

External links
 Crosshaven RFC website

Irish rugby union teams
Rugby union clubs in County Cork